John Lycan Kirkpatrick served as President of Davidson College from 1860 to 1866. Previously a minister from Virginia and formally educated at Hampden-Sydney College and Union Theological Seminary, Kirkpatrick entered the presidency on the eve of the American Civil War, which postponed Davidson's plans for growth and development. Kirkpatrick tasked with maintaining the financial solvency of the college and did so throughout the war.

References

External links 
Biography from the Davidson College Archives & Special Collections

Davidson College faculty
1813 births
1885 deaths
Hampden–Sydney College alumni
Presidents of Davidson College